John Hannah may refer to:

John Hannah (Methodist), called the elder (1792–1867), English Wesleyan  minister
John Hannah (archdeacon of Lewes), the younger, (1818–1888), his son, Anglican priest and schoolmaster
John Hannah (dean of Chichester) (1843–1931), his son, Anglican priest
John Hannah (VC) (1921–1947), Scottish RAF radio operator
John Hannah (American football) (born 1951), American football player
John Hannah (actor) (born 1962), Scottish actor
John Hannah (footballer) (born 1962), English football forward
John A. Hannah (1902–1991), American academic administrator and head of USAID
John D. Hannah (born c. 1940s), American academic
John H. Hannah Jr. (1939–2003), U.S. federal judge
John P. Hannah (born 1962), American government administrator
Jack Hannah (John Frederick Hannah, 1913–1994), American animation artist

See also
John Hanna (disambiguation)